Emil Richter (14 January 1894 – 16 March 1971) was a Czech chess master who was born and died in Prague.  He won the Czech Chess Championship in 1948 and was awarded the International Master title in 1951. Richter played in the unofficial 1936 Chess Olympiad.

References

Further reading
 British Chess Magazine, 1971, p. 207
 Deutsche Schachzeitung, 1971, p. 195

External links
 

1894 births
1971 deaths
Czech chess players
Chess International Masters
Sportspeople from Prague
20th-century chess players